Toelupe Poumulinuku Onesemo is a Samoan politician and Cabinet Minister. He is a member of the Fa'atuatua i le Atua Samoa ua Tasi party.

Onesemo was educated at the University of New South Wales in Sydney, Australia, obtaining a bachelor's and master's degree in civil engineering, as well as the University of the South Pacific, where he graduated with a Bachelor of Science and a teaching certificate. He worked as a teacher in Samoa from 1994 to 1999, and since 2002 has served as a public servant. In 2015 he was appointed chief executive of the Ministry of Works, Transport and Infrastructure.

He was first elected to the Legislative Assembly of Samoa in the April 2021 Samoan general election, winning the seat of Falealili No. 1.

On 24 May 2021 he was appointed Minister of Communications and Information Technology in the elected cabinet of Fiamē Naomi Mataʻafa. The appointment was disputed by the caretaker government. On 23 July 2021 the Court of Appeal ruled that the swearing-in ceremony was constitutional and binding, and that FAST had been the government since 24 May.

Notes

References

Living people
Members of the Legislative Assembly of Samoa
Government ministers of Samoa
Faʻatuatua i le Atua Samoa ua Tasi politicians
Samoan civil servants
University of New South Wales alumni
University of the South Pacific alumni
Samoan educators
Year of birth missing (living people)